OPPO Digital is an overseas division of Chinese multinational conglomerate BBK Electronics, sharing the brand name OPPO with the better known consumer electronics company Oppo, also owned by BBK. Established in 2004 in Menlo Park, California, US, it conducted all of its sales online. OPPO Digital designed and marketed audio and video equipment, including Blu-ray Disc players and personal audio products such as headphones and headphone amplifiers, mainly targeting markets in mainland China, Hong Kong, Taiwan, Japan, United States, Europe, Australia, New Zealand and India.

In 2018, OPPO Digital announced they were stopping production and development of new products starting on April 2, but would continue to support existing ones and sell products online until stock runs out.

Products 
In 2007 and 2008, OPPO introduced the DV-980H and DV-983H, DVD-to-1080p upconversion, multi-format players.

In 2009, OPPO introduced a "universal" Blu-ray player, BDP-83, compatible with DVD-Audio and Super Audio CD formats.  The unit included a video decoder from MediaTek and a video processing chip from Anchor Bay Technologies.

In 2018, OPPO discontinued production of all Blu-ray players, due to what they felt was a shrinking market for physical media players in the face of online channels and streaming. At this point, their models are only available as used, for prices much higher than their original retail.

DVD players
 DV-970HD
 DV-971H
 DV-980H
 DV-981HD
 DV-983H

Blu-Ray players 
 BDP-80
 BDP-83, OPPO's first universal Blu-Ray player
 BDP-93, launched 2010, with 3D function and dual HDMI output
 BDP-95, video section similar to BDP-93, but with audiophile audio section
 BDP-103, launched 2012, with dual HDMI input
 BDP-103D, launched 2013, video section similar to BDP-103, with Darbee-Visual-Presence-Technology
 DBP-101CI, video section similar to BDP-103, without internet option, modular convertible for professional applications
 BDP-105, video section similar to BDP-103, with audiophile audio section
 BDP-105D, launched 2013, first Blu-Ray player with Darbee-Visual-Presence-Technology
 UDP-203, launched 2016, OPPO's first 4K UHD Blu-Ray player, with High-dynamic-range imaging and Dolby-Vision compatible
 UDP-205, launched 2017, video section similar to UDP-203, with audiophile audio section

Recognition 
After entering the personal audio market in 2014, PM-1 headphones and HA-2 portable headphone amplifier/DAC have both received prestigious EISA "Best Product" awards.

References

External links 

Oppo
Audio equipment manufacturers of the United States
Electronics companies of the United States
Technology companies based in the San Francisco Bay Area
Chinese brands
Companies based in Menlo Park, California
Headphones manufacturers
Privately held companies of China
Electronics companies established in 2004
Chinese companies established in 2004